The U.S. Open Straight Pool Championship is a pool tournament held in the United States, and one of the few featuring the discipline of straight pool. The tournament has been held inconsistently and has been dormant since 2019. The tournament has been a less prestigious tournament since 2000, the last time the tournament was sanctioned by the Billiard Congress of America (BCA). The CueSports International (CSI) has sanctioned the event since, in 2007, 2016, 2017 and 2019. Steve Mizerak is the most successful player having won the tournament four times consecutively. The oldest player to win the tournament is Jimmy Caras at 58 years old at the time of his victory. The youngest player to win the tournament is Oliver Ortmann at 22 years old at the time of his victory.

Current tournament format
Up to 48 players participate in this event. The first phase of the tournament is a double-elimination format with the top 16 seeds receiving first-round byes. All matches are played to 125 points, except the final, which is played to 150.

Winners

Men

Top Performers

Women

References

External links
Website

Pool competitions
US Open (pool)